C-type lectin domain family 16, also known as CLEC16A, is a protein that in humans is encoded by the CLEC16A gene.

Function 

Little is known regarding the function of the CLEC16A protein, however it is shown to be highly expressed on B-lymphocytes, natural killer (NK) and dendritic cells. Despite its name CLEC16A may not function as a lectin because its C-type lectin domain is only 20 amino-acids long.

Clinical significance 

Polymorphisms in the CLEC16A gene are associated with an increased risk of multiple sclerosis as well as type I diabetes.

References

External links

Further reading